Parliamentary elections were held in Abkhazia in the spring of 2017. The first round was held on 12 March and a runoff held on 26 March. Voters elected the 6th convocation of the People's Assembly.

Campaign
27 out of 33 incumbent deputies were standing for re-election. Among the candidates was former President Alexander Ankvab, who was ousted in the 2014 revolution. Ankvab was nominated by initiative groups in three different constituencies, but decided to run in constituency 18 (Gudauta).

First round
Twelve candidates were elected in the first round of the elections, with 22 constituencies going to a second round. The first round was re-run in one constituency (17, Gudauta 1).

Second round
22 seats were contested in the second round.

Later Election 
A re-voting was held in the constituency 17 of Gudauta District, on 14 May.

References

2017
parliamentary
March 2017 events in Asia
2017